The 1948 World Archery Championships was the 12th edition of the event. It was held in London, Great Britain on 9–14 August 1948 and was organised by World Archery Federation (FITA).

Medals summary

Recurve

Medals table

References

External links
 World Archery website
 Complete results

World Championship
World Archery
A
World Archery Championships
World Archery Championships
World Archery Championships
International archery competitions hosted by the United Kingdom